The 6th Annual Gotham Independent Film Awards, presented by the Independent Filmmaker Project, were held on September 17, 1996. At the ceremony, hosted by Michael Moore for the second time, Al Pacino was honored with a Career Tribute with John Sayles, Walter Bernstein and Lee Dichter receiving the other individual awards. The Producer/Industry Executive Award was given to Charles Dolan, founder of Cablevision, and to the founders of the production company Good Machine, Ted Hope and James Schamus.

Winners

Breakthrough Director (Open Palm Award)
 Lisa Krueger – Manny & Lo

Filmmaker Award
 John Sayles

Writer Award
 Walter Bernstein

Below-the-Line Award
 Lee Dichter, sound mixer

Producer/Industry Executive Award
 Ted Hope and James Schamus, founders of the Good Machine production company
 Charles Dolan, founder of Cablevision

Career Tribute
 Al Pacino

References

External links
 

1996
1996 film awards